Missa Mercuria is a progressive metal project which involved members of the German bands Vanden Plas, Pink Cream 69 and Silent Force.

The album released by the project is a rock opera based on an idea and story by Karin Forstner and issued through Lion Music in 2002. The story revolves around the intervention of the Gods - represented by the four elements Fire, Water, Earth and Air - to prevent the destruction of Mankind and on the mission of the Gods' messenger Mercuria back in time.

It features lyrics written by D. C. Cooper and music written by Alex Beyrodt (Sinner, The Sygnet, Silent Force, Voodoo Circle), Günter Werno and Stephan Lill (Vanden Plas) and Alfred Koffler (Pink Cream 69). There are also vocal features of David Readman (Pink Cream 69), Andy Kuntz (Vanden Plas) and Sabine Edelsbacher (Edenbridge).

Track listing
All lyrics by D. C. Cooper, music as indicated

Personnel

Vocalists and characters
D. C. Cooper (Firegod)
Sabine Edelsbacher (Watergoddess)
Lori Williams (Earthgoddess)
Andy Kuntz (Airgod)
Isolde Groß (Mercuria)
David Readman (Narrator)

Musicians
Stephan Lill - guitars
Alfred Koffler - guitars
Alex Beyrodt - guitars
Günter Werno - keyboards
Dennis Ward - bass
Andreas Lill - drums
Pedro Weiss - percussion

Production
Dennis Ward - producer, engineer
Achim Kohler - mixing

References

External links
 Official Homepage

Rock operas
2002 albums
Albums produced by Dennis Ward (musician)